Francis Griffin C.S.Sp. (1893-1983) was an Irish Spiritan priest who served as Superior General of the Congregation of the Holy Spirit (Spiritans) from 1950 until 1962.

Born in Kilmurray, County Clare in 1893, he was educated locally in Kilmurray and Mullagh and then at Rockwell College from 1907 until 1911, Griffin went to Kimmage Manor to join the Spiritans. Attending University College Dublin studying Irish and French. He taught in Blackrock College from 1913 until 1916, when he moved to Switzerland.

He was ordained in 1920 in Switzerland, Fr. Griffin studied at University of Fribourg in Switzerland, earning a STL in 1921.

Fr Griffin was elected Superior General of the Congregation of the Holy Spirit in 1950, the first non-Frenchman to hold that post.

References

1893 births
1983 deaths
People from County Clare
Holy Ghost Fathers
Irish Spiritans
20th-century Irish Roman Catholic priests
University of Fribourg alumni
Alumni of University College Dublin
People educated at Rockwell College